Jeff Pyle (born October 7, 1958) is an American former ice hockey player and the current head coach of the ECHL Atlanta Gladiators.

Career 
Pyle has been a head coach in the ECHL since the 1998–99 season, when he coached the Mobile Mysticks. He remained as the head coach when the franchise moved to Gwinnett County to become the Gwinnett Gladiators for the 2003–04 season, staying in this position through the end of the 2010–11 season.

On July 13, 2011, Pyle was named head coach of the American Hockey League's Texas Stars.

It was announced on April 11, 2013, that Pyle would become the head coach and director of hockey operations of the ECHL's Evansville IceMen, effective July 1, 2013. On April 20, 2014, Pyle was relieved of his duties with Evansville due to disagreements on hockey operations with owner Ron Geary.

In September 2014, Pyle moved to Italy to become head coach of the HC Bulldogs Valpellice of Torre Pellice (TO), Piedmont.

On March 22, 2016, Pyle returned to the Evansville area as the head coach of the Southern Professional Hockey League's Evansville Thunderbolts, which was announced to replace the departing ECHL IceMen franchise.

In 2018, Pyle returned to Gwinnett County, Georgia, as the head coach of his old team, the since renamed Atlanta Gladiators.

Awards and honors

References

External links
 

1958 births
Living people
American ice hockey coaches
Binghamton Whalers players
Flint Generals players
Mohawk Valley Stars players
Northern Michigan Wildcats men's ice hockey players
Saginaw Generals players
Saginaw Hawks players
Ice hockey people from Missouri
People from Fort Leonard Wood, Missouri
American men's ice hockey left wingers